The Last American Vampire is an action horror novel by Seth Grahame-Smith and a sequel to Abraham Lincoln, Vampire Hunter, released on January 13, 2015, through New York–based publishing company Grand Central Publishing.

Plot

After turning assassinated President Abraham Lincoln into a vampire from the first book, vampire Henry O. Sturges, Lincoln's vampire-hunting mentor, realizes he has gone against the rules of the Union of Vampires by doing so. Lincoln is horrified at becoming a vampire, as it turns him into the exact thing he has been fighting against all his life, and jumps out the window and burns himself to death.

Henry is summoned to New York City, the Union's headquarters, by their leader Adam Plantagenet, a highly respected older vampire, alive since 1305. He shows Henry boxes containing the heads of some of their emissaries along with a note from the mysterious "A. Grander VIII". He is tasked with finding and stopping this man from destroying more vampires. Plantagenet himself is killed soon after.

Henry decides to begin his hunt in London, England, under the guise of a textile importer. Unsure where first to go, he decides to find out the vampire presence here. It turns out that the Henry Irving, a famed actor in England, is a vampire. Wanting to get in touch with Irving, he tracks down and finds his assistant, Abraham "Bram" Stoker. Initially reluctant to allow Henry access to his charge, he relents when Henry reveals his vampirism. Stoker and his family quickly become one of Henry's close friends.

Along the way, Henry reveals some of the events from his life as a human and his early time as a vampire including turning his adopted daughter, the first English baby born in the "New World", Virginia Dare, into a vampire. His travels and adventures bring him across the world where he helps Arthur Conan Doyle and stops Jack the Ripper. He is also put into action as a United States Government agent, and becomes a highly decorated veteran of both World Wars. He also befriends inventor Nikola Tesla and assists in assassinating the feared mystic Rasputin. Grander is revealed to be Virginia Dare and Henry and Lincoln (revealed to be alive) track her down. They fight until Dare is killed by Henry but not before mortally wounding Lincoln.

The last portion of the novel has Henry meeting Alexei Romanov, also a vampire, who attempts to recruit him, now the last known American vampire, into a reconstituted Union of Vampires.

Television adaptation 
In October 2018, it was announced that NBC had given a "script commitment plus penalty" to a television adaptation of the novel from author Seth Grahame-Smith, David Katzenberg, Terry Matalas, and 20th Century Fox Television. Matalas will write the potential series and executive produce alongside Grahame-Smith and Katzenberg. It was to be on Quibi, but with the shuttering of Quibi, there is no update on the show.

See also
Vampire literature

References

2015 American novels
Sequel novels
American horror novels
American vampire novels
Novels by Seth Grahame-Smith
Grand Central Publishing books